Noorindoo is a rural locality in the Maranoa Region, Queensland, Australia.

Geography 
Bingi Crossing is a ford on the Balonne River near the current River Road which connects Noorindoo with neighbouring Warkon.

Road infrastructure
The Carnarvon Highway runs through from south-west to north-west, while the Surat Developmental Road runs along the southern boundary.

History 
The locality takes its name from the parish and lagoon, which in turn come from the pastoral run name, used from before 1858, reportedly the name of an Aboriginal person.

Nellybri Provisonal School opened circa 1889. Between about 1896 and 1899 it became a half-time school in conjunction with Retreat Provisional School (meaning the schools shared a single teacher). The school closed in 1906. Nellybri is a pastoral station.

Beranga Bridge School opened circa 1896. It closed circa 1900. Beranga Creek and the Beranga pastoral station are within Noorindoo.

In September 1921, a meeting was held at the Frogmoor pastoral station to apply for a provisional school. Beranga Provisional School opened circa August 1922. It closed temporarily in 1926 due to low student numbers, and closed permanently circa August 1929.

St Paul's Anglican Church opened at Bingi Crossing circa 1925. Its last service was 20 December 1942.

References 

Maranoa Region
Localities in Queensland